P. Kunhikrishnan (born 30 May 1961) is a Space Scientist from India. Currently, he is a Distinguished Scientist (Apex Scale) & Former Director of U.R.Rao Satellite Centre (URSC), in Bengaluru, India. He was a member of Space Commission, Government of India

Personal life 
Kunhikrishnan was born on 30 May 1961 in Payyanur, Kerala as the son of (Late) A K P Chinda Poduval and P Narayani Amma. His wife,Girija is an engineer at Vikram Sarabhai Space Centre (VSSC).His sons are Navaneeth Krishnan and Aravind Krishnan.

Kunhikrishnan is also a trained Indian classical flautist.

Education 
Kunhikrishnan completed his Bachelor of Science in Mathematics from Payyanur College in 1981 and later completed BTech in Electronics & Communication Engineering from College of Engineering(CET), Trivandrum in 1986.

Career 
Kunhikrishnan joined Indian Space Research Organisation in 1986 after graduating from College of Engineering, Trivandrum(CET). He was part of Systems Reliability Entity at Vikram Sarabhai Space Centre (VSSC) and contributed to various launch vehicle missions starting from ASLV-D1.

He was Associate Project Director for PSLV-C12 & PSLV-C14, Project Director of PSLV-C15 to PSLV-C27 (from the year 2010 to 2015) and Deputy Director of VSSC for Mechanisms, Vehicle Integration and Testing (MVIT).

As a Project Director, he could accomplish 13 consecutive successful  PSLV missions including the launch of India's prestigious Mars Orbiter Mission(Mangalyaan) by PSLV-C25.

In 2015, he took over as the Director of Satish Dhawan Space Centre, Sriharikota, the Spaceport of India. As Director, during 2015-2018, he was instrumental in transforming the Spaceport of India  into a world-class facility by establishing & initiating huge infrastructure to support multiple launches per year, catering to the futuristic demand.

The 'Visitors Complex' at Sriharikota, that enables 10,000 visitors to witness satellite launches, was conceived and initiated by him during this period.

In 2018, he took over as the Director of U.R.Rao Satellite Centre (URSC), Bengaluru, the lead Centre in the country for design, development and realization of all the satellites of ISRO. As Director of URSC, he was steering the Centre in realising India’s Satellites for national requirements and their operationalization in respective orbits.   13 satellites were launched under his leadership.

He was the Chairman of Working Group of the Whole (WGW) of United Nations Committee on Peaceful Uses of Outer space (UNCOPUOS) headquartered at Vienna.

He is the National President of Indian Society of Systems for Science and Engineering (ISSE).

He is a member of Space Commission, Government of India since Feb, 2020.

Awards and honors 
 ISRO Individual Merit Award, 2010
 Astronautical Society of India (ASI) Award, 2011
 ISRO Performance Excellence Award, 2013
 ISRO Team Excellence Award as Team Leader of PSLV C-25/Mars Orbiter Mission, 2013
 Swadeshi Sastra Puraskar, 2013
Sir CV Raman Memorial award
IET Eminent Engineer Award, 2020
Honorary Degree of Doctor of Science from LNCT University, 2021
Honorary Degree of Doctor of Science from GITAM University, 2019
Honorary Degree of Doctor of Science by Jawaharlal Nehru Technological University (JNTU), 2016
ISRO Outstanding Achievement Award for Distinguished service in ISRO, 2018
Vigyan Pratibha Samman  by the Government of Madhya Pradesh, 2017 
Astronautical Society of India (ASI) award, 2011 
National President, Indian Society of Systems for Science & Engineering - ISSE
Fellow of Indian National Academy of Engineers - INAE 
Fellow of Institution of Electrical & Telecom Engineering - IETE 
Fellow of AP Academy of SciencesChairman, Working Group of the Whole in United Nations Committee on Peaceful Uses of Outer space (UNCOPUOS) 
Co-chair for India-US Civil Space Joint Working Group (CSJWG)
Co-Chair, ISRO-German working group on space subject.
Member, International Academy of Astronautics (IAA)

References 

Living people
1961 births
People from Kannur district
Engineers from Kerala
Indian Space Research Organisation people
Satish Dhawan Space Centre
Indian space scientists